Todd Hickman (born 1963) is an American football coach and former player.  He was the head football coach for the University of Minnesota Morris Cougars football team, a position he held since the 2007 season.  Prior to coming to UMM, Hickman was the head football coach at Hibbing Community College in Hibbing, Minnesota.  While there he also had coaching duties in basketball and baseball.  Hickman finished his 18th year at UMM in 2014; while there he has been the offensive coordinator, defensive coordinator and coached nearly all positions, at times several at once.

He finishes with a record 30-47 overall and 22-35 in UMAC play over eight seasons. During his stretch at UMM Hickman coached over 45 All-UMAC players, one All-Region player and one Co-SIDA All-American.

Head coaching record

References

1963 births
Living people
American football running backs
Hibbing Cardinals football coaches
Minnesota Morris Cougars football coaches
Minnesota Morris Cougars football players
Nebraska–Kearney Lopers football coaches
High school football coaches in Minnesota